Lieutenant General Sir Robert Irvin Scallon  (3 April 1857 – 1 May 1939) was a British officer in the Indian Army.

Military career
Scallon was commissioned into the British Army in 1876 and joined the 72nd Highlanders in 1877. He transferred to the Bombay Staff Corps in 1877 and took part in the Battle of Kandahar in 1880 during the Second Anglo-Afghan War. He became adjutant of the 23rd Bombay Light Infantry in 1881 and took part in the Burma Campaign in 1886. He became Deputy Assistant Adjutant General at Poona in 1891, Deputy Assistant Adjutant General at Bombay in 1895 and Inspector General of the Imperial Service Troops in 1897.

Scallon took part in the Tirah Campaign in 1897 and became Commanding Officer of the 23rd Bombay Rifles in 1898. He commanded the Zhob Section of Blockading Force for the Mahsud Waziri expedition in 1900. He was promoted to Lieutenant-colonel on 12 February 1902, and went on to command troops in the Zhob District during disturbances in 1902 and to command troops during operations in the Aden Hinterland in 1903. He was appointed Commander of 3rd Indian Brigade in India in 1904, General Officer Commanding Aden in 1905 and Commander of the Bangalore Brigade in 1906.

Scallon became Adjutant-General, India in 1908, Secretary to Government of India, Army Department in 1909 and General Officer Commanding Burma Division in 1911 before becoming General Officer Commanding 8th (Lucknow) Division in 1913. He served in World War I as General Officer Commanding-in-Chief of the Northern Army in India in 1914 and then as General Officer Commanding-in-Chief Southern Army in 1915 before retiring in 1919.

In retirement Scallon worked in high positions in the Boy Scouts and the Red Cross.

References

|-
 

|-
 

1857 births
1939 deaths
Military personnel from Surrey
Indian Army generals of World War I
Knights Grand Cross of the Order of the Bath
Knights Commander of the Order of the Indian Empire
Companions of the Distinguished Service Order
British Indian Army generals